Hilbert High School is a public high school in Hilbert, Wisconsin, United States. It is part of the Hilbert School District. The school offers a range of courses, including college prep, advanced placement, core curricular, and vocational courses. It also offers a variety of fine arts, performing arts, athletic programs and clubs.

References 

Public high schools in Wisconsin
Schools in Calumet County, Wisconsin